James George Castell Rowe (born 4 July 1979) is a former English cricketer who made three first-class cricket appearances for Durham University Centre of Cricketing Excellence in 2001. Rowe batted left-handed. He was born at Farnborough in south-east London and was educated at Tonbridge School in Kent.

After playing some Second XI cricket for Essex County Cricket Club in 2000, Rowe made his  first-class debut for Durham UCCE against Durham County Cricket Club in April 2001. During the 2001 season, he represented the University in two further first-class matches against Lancashire and Worcestershire as well as playing for Kent County Cricket Club's Second XI. He scored 128 runs at a batting average of 42.66, with highest score of 74 not out, his only first-class half century.

Rowe graduated from Durham University (Hatfield College) in 2001.

The following season he represented the Kent Cricket Board in a single List A match against Hampshire County Cricket Club in the 2002 Cheltenham & Gloucester Trophy, scoring 30 runs.

Family
His father, Charles Rowe played first-class cricket for Kent County Cricket Club and Glamorgan County Cricket Club between 1974 and 1984.

References

External links
 

1979 births
Living people
People from Farnborough, London
Cricketers from Greater London
People educated at Tonbridge School
Alumni of Hatfield College, Durham
English cricketers
Durham MCCU cricketers
Kent Cricket Board cricketers